Wayne Van Dorp (born May 19, 1961) is a Canadian former professional ice hockey player. He played for the Edmonton Oilers, Pittsburgh Penguins, Chicago Blackhawks and Quebec Nordiques. In The Netherlands he played for Feenstra Flyers Heerenveen and Gijs Groningen. He has a Stanley Cup ring with Edmonton for playing 3 regular season games and 3 playoff games in 1987.  However Van Dorp did not play enough regular season games (40) or a game in the finals to get his name on the Stanley Cup. Van Dorp played for the Netherlands national ice hockey team in the 1986 World Ice Hockey Championships, Pool B.

Career statistics

External links

1961 births
Bellingham Blazers players
Canadian people of Dutch descent
Chicago Blackhawks players
Dutch ice hockey left wingers
Edmonton Oilers players
Halifax Citadels players
Living people
Milwaukee Admirals (IHL) players
Nova Scotia Oilers players
Pittsburgh Penguins players
Quebec Nordiques players
Rochester Americans players
Saginaw Hawks players
Seattle Breakers players
Ice hockey people from Vancouver
Stanley Cup champions
Undrafted National Hockey League players
Canadian ice hockey left wingers